Lendy Park School is a Christian, independent, preparatory, day school for boys and girls in Marondera, Zimbabwe. The school was founded in 1991 and moved to its present site in 1992.

Lendy Park School is a member of the Association of Trust Schools (ATS) and the Head is a member of the Conference of Heads of Independent Schools in Zimbabwe (CHISZ).

See also
 List of schools in Zimbabwe

References

External links
  Official website
  on the ATS website

Private schools in Zimbabwe
Co-educational schools in Zimbabwe
Day schools in Zimbabwe
Boarding schools in Zimbabwe
Educational institutions established in 1991
1991 establishments in Zimbabwe
Member schools of the Association of Trust Schools
Marondera